The Government Eduardo Riedel will be the period in the political history of Mato Grosso do Sul that will begin with the inauguration of Eduardo Riedel as governor of Mato Grosso do Sul, on January 1, 2023, after defeating Renan Contar in the 2022 elections. It is slated to end on January 1, 2027.

His inauguration will take place on January 1, 2023, at the Legislative Assembly of Mato Grosso do Sul, on the same day as Luiz Inácio Lula da Silva's inauguration as president of Brazil.

Government plan 
In the area of education, it intends to expand full-time schools and implement the Qualification Voucher to expand people's opportunities to connect with the job market.

One of Eduardo's proposals for health is to create polyclinics in the four health regions with imaging services and a multiprofessional care block for neuropsychomotor support, aimed at genetic, chronic, degenerative diseases and intellectual disorders (autism). He also wants to expand the use of telemedicine, bioelectronic medicine and artificial intelligence, strengthening the interface between Health and Science.

In addition, it proposes to implement the Acolhe MS program, aimed at serving the LGBTQI+ population, the prison system, the indigenous population, quilombolas, riverside dwellers, homeless people, gypsies, rural residents and the black population.

In public safety, he presents the project to intensify the fight against femicide, harassment practices, racism and all forms of violence. It also wants to fight crime in the border regions and on the Bioceânica Route and implement the Social Observatory Program, to use data intelligence in the fight against crime.

In the economy, Riedel wants to encourage investments in new production chains, with the defense industry and logistics and equipment companies, while also attracting companies aligned with the vocations, potentialities and economic dynamics of each municipality.

He will also use social media to expand training and professional qualification opportunities and encourage increased employability of women and young people.

In infrastructure, prioritize investments in works that facilitate the flow of production. It also proposes to implement the Productive Connection Network program aimed at improving runways and airport structures and preparing the state plan for bicycle lanes.

In the environmental area, among its proposals is to review the fishing legislation in the state with a view to creating a legal framework that creates opportunities for biodiversity conservation and sustainable development for all types of fishing. It also intends to encourage the production and use of solar energy, biofuels and other renewable energy sources.

In the popular housing area, it intends to reduce the housing deficit.

Riedel in sport, in his government plan is to set up regional sport centers to care for children, adolescents, people with disabilities and the elderly. It also wants to strengthen local sports practices: soccer schools, gyms, terraces, walking routes, outdoor gyms, cycling and others.

In culture, it is willing to maintain and reclassify cultural spaces seeking the use of unused or underutilized buildings. It also plans to offer training and qualification to workers in the artistic and cultural sectors.

In public management , one of its proposals is to promote digital integration of public services. The candidate wants to reduce the public machine through digital processes in order to reduce the cost of the state for the citizen.

Cabinet 
It was announced 11 secretaries, for now, 5 secretaries were announced:

Flávio César: Secretary of Finance
Eduardo Rocha: Civil House
Ana Carolina Ali: State Attorney General
Ana Carolina Nardes: Administration Secretary
Hélio Peluffo: State Secretariat for Infrastructure and Logistics

References 

Tenures in political office by individual
2010s in Brazil
2020s in Brazil